Package film may refer to:

 Anthology film, a film composed of several short subject films
 Overwrap
 Plastic film
 Plastic wrap
 Shrink wrap, a pellicle of plastic that is used to contain an object usually for sale
 Stretch wrap